Ryan Barrett (born 27 December 1982) was an English boxer. He won the English super featherweight title in 2008, and the WBU welterweight title in 2013 before retiring later in 2014. Barrett is best known for his loss to 2004 Athens Olympics silver medalist Amir Khan via a TKO in 2006; after which, he went on to fight for the British featherweight title in 2007.

Amateur
Barrett started boxing at the age of seven, with Thamesmead ABC. He moved to Eltham ABC aged 8, where he won schoolboy titles and class B and C NABC titles under the training of his father, Steve Barrett. Ryan finished with a record of 75 fights; 60 wins and 15 losses.

Professional
Barrett made his pro debut on 13 June 2002. He won the British Masters Featherweight Championship on points against Jamie McKeever. He challenged for the British Featherweight title, but lost against John Simpson in the fifth round. Barrett is an English Superfeatherweight Champion, beating Femi Fehintola in the third round of their fight. He is also an International Masters Lightweight Champion, winning in the first round against Mark Alexander. He challenged for the WBU Lightweight World Title in 2009, but lost on points against Willie Limond. On 7 December 2013 in Neuwied, Germany, Barrett was given a chance to avenge his loss in the Masters to Geoffrey Munika and in doing so took the vacant WBU Welterweight World Title with a 3rd-round TKO.

Professional boxing record

References

External links

English male boxers
Featherweight boxers
Living people
1982 births